The Yinchuan–Kunming Expressway, designated as G85 and commonly referred to as the Yinkun Expressway is an expressway in China that connects the cities of Yinchuan, Ningxia and Kunming, Yunnan.

It passes through the following cities:

 Yinchuan, Ningxia
 Guyuan, Ningxia
 Pingliang, Gansu
 Baoji, Shaanxi
 Hanzhong, Shaanxi
 Bazhong, Sichuan
 Guang'an, Sichuan

Chongqing
Neijiang, Sichuan
Yibin, Sichuan
Zhaotong, Yunnan
Kunming, Yunnan

References

Chinese national-level expressways
Expressways in Chongqing
Expressways in Sichuan
Expressways in Yunnan